Tabacalera, formerly the Compañía Arrendataria de Tabacos, was a Spanish tobacco monopoly whose origins date back to 1636, making it the oldest tobacco company in the world.

In 1999, the company merged with SEITA of France to form Altadis, which was later purchased by Imperial Tobacco. Its brands included Ducados and Fortuna.

Tabacalera owns 50% stake in Cuba's official cigar export operation Corporación Habanos. Since buying the stake 15 years ago, Tabacalera has played a key role in marketing and selling Cuban cigars in more than 150 countries around the world.

References

Tobacco companies of Spain
Companies based in Madrid
Defunct manufacturing companies of Spain
Former monopolies
Companies established in 1636
1636 establishments in Spain
Spanish companies disestablished in 1999
Imperial Brands